Arniston is a small seaside settlement on the coast of the Overberg region of South Africa, close to Cape Agulhas, the southernmost tip of Africa.

Wreck of Arniston

In May 1815, a British East Indiaman, Arniston, was rounding the Cape in convoy on a journey to repatriate wounded British soldiers from Ceylon. The ship lacked a chronometer – an expensive instrument at the time – and consequently had to rely on other ships in the fleet to calculate the longitude of the group. After being separated from the convoy in heavy seas, the captain of Arniston was obliged to rely solely on dead reckoning to navigate.  Thinking incorrectly that he was west of the Cape of Good Hope because of lack of headway, led to an incorrect assumption that Cape Agulhas was Cape Point. Consequently, Arniston was wrecked when her captain headed north for St Helena, operating on the incorrect belief the ship had already passed Cape Point, the master steered north for St Helena and ran the ship onto the rocks at Waenhuiskrans.  Only six of the 378 people on board survived the wrecking.

The survivors spent several days on the beach before being discovered by a farmer's son.  A memorial, a replica of which can be seen today, was erected on the beach by the wife of Colonel Andrew Geils (here spelled "Giels"), whose four unaccompanied children were lost in the tragedy.  The memorial bears the following inscription:

Over the years, the name of the wreck has become synonymous with the name of the location and today the labels 'Arniston' and 'Waenhuiskrans' are used interchangeably.

Today
At first only a fishing community, Arniston has become a holiday destination and its hinterland a region for viticulture.  The fishing village, characterized by its lime-washed and thatched houses, remains unspoiled and has been declared a national monument in its entirety.  Fishermen still go to sea in boats of the style that would have been familiar to locals in the early nineteenth century, although now under contract to larger commercial enterprises. Whale watching is a popular tourist activity. The Arniston Hotel is a popular tourist destination that looks out over the ocean. 
The closest major town is Bredasdorp,  to the north.  The Overberg Test Range is situated adjacent to the town.

References

Remembering Arniston: A Bicentenary Picture Book in Commemoration of the Wreck of the HMS Arniston, South Africa, 30 May 1815 Paperback

External links
 Local Tourism Authority
 Arniston Lodge Home Page
 Arniston (ship)
 Arniston Waenhuiskrans Listing
 Arniston / Waenhuiskrans
 History of Arniston
 Hotagterklip and Kassiesbaai - Conservation and community challenges of two fishing villages in the Overberg - Ashley Lillie, 1995

Remembering Arniston

Monuments and memorials in South Africa
Tourist attractions in the Western Cape
Maritime history of South Africa
Populated places in the Cape Agulhas Local Municipality
Populated coastal places in South Africa
South African heritage sites